"Tongue Tied" is a song by Australian pop rock band Boom Crash Opera, written and produced by founding member Peter Farnan. The song was released in January 1995 as the second single from their fourth studio album, Born (1995), and peaked at number 25 on the Australian Singles Chart.

Track listing
Australian CD single
 "Tongue Tied"
 "Tongue Tied" (Tastes Like an Ashtray mix)
 "Tongue Tied" (Gurgulurmix)
 "Tongue Tied" (Candy Probe mix)
 "More Is More"

Charts

References

External links
 Boom Crash Opera website

1994 songs
1995 singles
Ariola Records singles
Boom Crash Opera songs